The 2013 Rally Poland, formally the 70. Rajd Polski, was the ninth round of the 2013 European Rally Championship season.

Results

Special stages

References

Poland
2013 in Polish sport
Rally of Poland